László Novakovszky (27 December 1923 – 12 September 2008) was a Hungarian basketball player. He competed in the men's tournament at the 1948 Summer Olympics.

References

1923 births
2008 deaths
Hungarian men's basketball players
Olympic basketball players of Hungary
Basketball players at the 1948 Summer Olympics
Basketball players from Budapest